The OMX Stockholm PI, formerly known as SAX All Share, is a stock market index of all shares that trade on the Stockholm Stock Exchange.

External links
Official OMX Stockholm PI composition

Swedish stock market indices